Lini is a given name, nickname and surname. It may refer to:

 Ham Lin̄i (born 1951), ni-Vanuatu politician and Deputy Prime Minister of Vanuatu, brother of Walter
 Motarilavoa Hilda Lin̄i], politician and a chief of the Turaga nation of Pentecost Island in Vanuatu, sister of Walter
 Oscar Lini (1928–2016), Italian footballer
 Walter Lini (1942–1999), ni-Vanuatu Anglican priest and first Prime Minister of Vanuatu
 Lini Evans (born 1976), Canadian singer and actress
 Karoline Lini Söhnchen (1897–1978), German diver